Ira Philip (16 December 1925 – 9 April 2018) was a Bermudian writer and politician.

Early life 
On 16 December 1925, Philip was born in Somerset Village, Bermuda.

Career 
Philip's journalism career stretched six decades and was primary associated with the Bermuda Recorder and [[Bermuda Broadcasting

|ZFB Radio]]. Philip counted Richard Allen, Marcus Garvey and A. Philip Randolph among his influences. He later represented the Progressive Labour Party (PLP) as a member of the Senate, and, in 2015, received the Drum Major Awards from the PLP.

Personal life 
On 9 April 2018, Philip died at 92.

Selected publications
 Freedom Fighters: From Monk to Mazumbo, 1988
 Heroines in the Medical Field of Bermuda, 1994
 The History of the Bermuda Industrial Union: a Definitive History of the Organised Labour Movement in Bermuda
 Champ: The One and Only Alma Hunt

References

1925 births
2018 deaths
Progressive Labour Party (Bermuda) politicians
Members of the Senate of Bermuda
Bermudian writers
Bermudian historians
People from Sandys Parish